Pieter Sand Lehrer, (born 29 January 1965) is a sprint canoer from Antigua and Barbuda who competed in the mid-1990s. At the 1996 Summer Olympics, he advanced to the semifinals of the C-2 1000 m event, but did not compete. Lehrer was the head coach for the Harvard Crimson men's soccer program until 2019.

References

Sports-Reference.com profile

1965 births
Antigua and Barbuda male canoeists
Canoeists at the 1996 Summer Olympics
Living people
Olympic canoeists of Antigua and Barbuda
Harvard Crimson men's soccer coaches
UCLA Bruins men's soccer players
Antigua and Barbuda football managers
Antigua and Barbuda footballers
California Golden Bears men's soccer coaches
Antigua and Barbuda expatriate sportspeople in the United States
Association footballers not categorized by position
Antigua and Barbuda people of German descent